Jur Spijkers (born 18 March 1997) is a Dutch judoka.

He is the bronze medallist of the 2021 Judo Grand Slam Tel Aviv.

On 12 November 2022 he won a silver medal at the 2022 European Mixed Team Judo Championships as part of team Netherlands.

References

External links
 

1997 births
Living people
Dutch male judoka
Sportspeople from Tilburg
20th-century Dutch people
21st-century Dutch people